"Drive South" is a song written by John Hiatt, and recorded by him on his 1988 album Slow Turning. The song was later recorded by Kelly Willis on her 1990 debut album, Well Travelled Love. Neither versions were released as singles.

The Forester Sisters version
In 1990, The Forester Sisters recorded the song with guest vocals from The Bellamy Brothers. This version appeared on the Forester Sisters' album Come Hold Me. It charted on both the Hot Country Singles & Tracks charts in the United States and the RPM Country Tracks charts in Canada.

Chart performance

Suzy Bogguss version

In 1992, Suzy Bogguss recorded the song for her album Voices in the Wind, her first release on Liberty Records. The song served as the first single release from the album. It was Bogguss's highest-peaking single, reaching number 2 on the country music charts in early 1993 (having been blocked from #1 by Lorrie Morgan's "What Part of No"). It also reached number 94 on the UK pop chart in July 1993. Bogguss's version also had a music video, directed by Deaton-Flanigen Productions.

Chart performance

Year-end charts

References

1990 singles
1992 singles
John Hiatt songs
The Bellamy Brothers songs
The Forester Sisters songs
Suzy Bogguss songs
Kelly Willis songs
Songs written by John Hiatt
Song recordings produced by Jimmy Bowen
Music videos directed by Deaton-Flanigen Productions
Warner Records singles
Liberty Records singles
1988 songs
Vocal collaborations